Asafo Market is a trading centre in Asafo, Kumasi, the capital of Ashanti, Ghana, to the western side of the Asafo interchange. Asafo Market was formerly called Nkrumah Market, which was named after the first Prime Minister of Ghana, Kwame Nkrumah, but the name was changed to Asafo Market when  Nkrumah was overthrown.

References

Buildings and structures in Kumasi
Retail markets in Ghana